Makueni County (formerly Makueni District) is a county in the former Eastern Province of Kenya. Its capital and largest town is Wote. The county has a population of 987,653 (2019 census). The county lies between Latitude 1° 35' and 2° 59' South and Longitude 37° 10' and 38° 30' East. It borders Machakos to the North, Kitui to the East, Taita Taveta to the South and Kajiado to the West and covers an area of 8,008.9 km2.

Physical and topical features 
The county has a number of prominent features in including volcanic Chyullu hills which lie along the South West border of the county Mbooni hills in Mbooni sub county and Kilungu and Iuani hills in Kaiti sub county, Makongo forest and scenic view, Makuli forest and Nzaui hill.

Climatic conditions 
The county experience semi-arid climatic conditions with an average temperature range between 15C – 26C and Annual rainfall ranges between 250mm to 400mm per annum on the lower regions of the county and the higher region receives rainfall ranging from 800mm to 900mm.

Demographics 
The county has a total population of 987,653 of which 497,942 females and 20 intersex persons. There are 77,495 household with an average household size of 5.8 persons per household and a population density 6 people per square kilometre.

Administrative and political units

Administrative units 
There are 6 sub counties, 16 divisions, 63 locations and 127 sub-locations.

Sub-counties 
Makueni
Kilungu
Kilome
Kibwezi East 
Kibwezi West
Nzaui
Kathonzweni
Mbooni west
Mbooni East.

Political units 
It has 6 constituencies and 30 county assembly wards and 60 sub-wards.

 Makueni constituency
 Mbooni constituency
 Kibwezi East constituency
 Kibwezi West constituency
 Kaiti constituency
 Kilome constituency

Political leadership 
Kivutha Kibwana is the Governor and serving his last in office after being elected in 2013 and 2017 general elections. He is also the chairman of legal and human rights committee under council of governors. His deputy is Adelina Ndeto Mwau. Mutula Kilonzo Jnr is the Senator and has been senator since 2013. Rose Museo Mumo is the first elected women representative and was re-elected in 2017 general elections.

For Makueni County, the County Executive Committee comprises:-

Members of parliament in Makueni County 2017–2022 

 Hon. Jessica Nduku Kiko Mbalu of Wiper democratic Movement Kenya Member of Parliament Kibwezi East.
 Hon.Patrick Musimba as Independent Candidate Member of Parliament Kibwezi West Constituency.
 Hon.Daniel Kitonga Maanzo of Wiper democratic Movement Kenya Member of Parliament Makueni Constituency.
 Hon.Kimilu, Joshua Kivinda of Wiper democratic Movement Kenya Member of Parliament Kaiti Constituency.
 Hon.Nzambia, Thuddeus Kithua of Wiper democratic Movement Kenya Member of Parliament Kilome Constituency.
 Hon. Erastus Kivasu Nzyoka of Wiper democratic Movement KenyaMember of Parliament Mbooni Constituency.

Education 
There are 78 ECD centres 997 primary schools and 375 secondary schools. The county has also 3 teachers training colleges, 37 Youth Polytechnics, 231 adult training institutions, 2 technical training institutions, 3 university campuses.

Health 
There is a total of 156 health facilities, 726 hospital beds and 1261 cots in the county. County has 815 health personnel of different cadre.

HIV prevalence rate is 5.1% in 2017.

Transport and Communication 
There is one air strip and 8 railway lines with total coverage of 140 km. The county is covered by 7670 Km of road network. of this 6,776 km is covered by earth surface, 706 km is murram surface and 188 km of surface is covered by Bitumen.

There are twenty post office with 4,850 installed letter boxes, 3,302 rented letter boxes, 1,548 vacant letter boxes and 31 licences stamp vendors.

Trade and Commerce 
There are 420 trading centres, 17,390 registered businesses, 153 banking services(including agents& insurance, 882 mobile service providers and 382 agro-vets, chemists& pharmacies.

Universities and colleges in Makueni County

 South Eastern Kenya university (SEKU)wote campus – The campus is located at Soi Plaza building, 2nd floor, above Equity Bank in Wote Town, the headquarters of Makueni County, and about 140 km from Kitui main campus. The campus began its operations in March, 2012. Currently, the campus has a student population of 315 who are taking classes in different regular, part-time and institutional-based programmes.
 Wote Technical Training Institute
 Kenya Medical Training College KMTC Makueni Campus.
Kenya Medical Training College KMTC Makindu Campus.
Kenya Medical Training College KMTC Mbuvo Campus.

Constituencies
Since 2010, county has six constituencies: 
Mbooni Constituency
Kilome Constituency
Kaiti Constituency
Makueni Constituency
Kibwezi West Constituency
Kibwezi East Constituency

Other Divisions

South Eastern Kenya Region

Urbanisation
 Source: OpenDataKenya

Wealth/Poverty Level
 Source: OpenDataKenya Worldbank

Villages and settlements
 Astra Farm
 Emali
 Kikima
 Nunguni
 Mbeetwani

See also
Kitui County
Machakos County
Taita Taveta County
Kajiado County

References

External links
Makueni County Council
http://www.aridland.go.ke/districts.asp?DistrictID=15
https://web.archive.org/web/20070628140851/http://www.drylandsresearch.org.uk/dr_kenya.html

 
Counties of Kenya